Craspedochiton rubiginosus rubiginosus is a subspecies of chiton in the family Acanthochitonidae.

"Rubiginosus" is Latin for "rusty or  rust-colored".

References

 Powell A. W. B., New Zealand Mollusca, William Collins Publishers Ltd, Auckland, New Zealand 1979 

Acanthochitonidae
Chitons of New Zealand